The HTC Touch, also known as the HTC P3450 or its codename the HTC Elf or the HTC Vogue for the CDMA variant, is a Windows Mobile 6-powered Pocket PC designed and manufactured by HTC. Its main, unique feature is a user interface named TouchFLO that detects a sweeping motion and can distinguish between a finger and a stylus. TouchFLO incorporates stylus-free access to a music player, a photo album, a video player and a picture-based contact book.
The carrier bound names for this phone include Verizon Wireless XV6900, T-Mobile MDA Touch, O2 XDA Nova, Okta Touch and Vodafone VPA Touch.

In November 2007, HTC started to sell an "Enhanced" Touch, also known as the HTC P3452 or its codename the HTC Elfin, with double the RAM and ROM of the original version (128 MB and 256 MB respectively). The newer version is also available in two new colors: white and burgundy.

Sales

HTC shipped 1 million units within 5 months of the launch, and shipped another million in the following 6 months.

Features

Connectivity
Tri band GSM / GPRS (Class 10) / EDGE: GSM 900/1800/1900 (2.75 G)
802.11b/g Wi-Fi
Bluetooth 2.0.   Supports most common profiles including serial port, FTP, HID (keyboard and mice), headset, hands free, DUN (dial up networking for using the phone as a wireless modem for a notebook or desktop), and A2DP Bluetooth stereo.
HTC ExtUSB (11-pin mini-USB & audio jack)
Input
Touchscreen (designed for fingers and the included stylus)
5 -way directional block (including action button)
Power and camera buttons
TouchFLO
Memory
128 MB (35.46 MB user-accessible) flash ROM
64 MB (47.89 MB accessible) SDRAM
microSD expansion slot (SD 2.0 compatible, 1 GB card included, 16 GB SDHC Tested Successfully)
Other features
TI OMAP 850 201 MHz processor
2.0-megapixel CMOS color camera
2.8 in. LCD screen (240x320 px, 65k-color, QVGA, TFT)

HTC Vogue
The CDMA version of the Touch, known as the "HTC Vogue" or the "HTC P3050", has double the RAM and ROM of the original Touch, a faster 400 MHz processor (QualComm MSM7500), and a faster over the air data capability, but no Wi-Fi. This is sold under the name Okta Touch by Telecom in New Zealand. Also sold as the "HTC Touch" through Sprint Nextel and Alltel and as the "XV6900" through Verizon Wireless in the United States; as the "HTC Touch" by Bell Mobility and Telus Mobility in Canada; and through Raya and i2 Mobile in Egypt.

Operating system upgrades
The Windows Mobile version is upgradable, to 6.5.* via ROMs from XDA-Developers website.

Linux and Android conversions
Linux and Android operating systems are being ported to these phones. Vogue Linux runs on the HTC Vogue. Wing Linux, an Android version, is in development and available via ROMS, from xda-developers website. Android versions through 2.3 (Gingerbread) have been successfully ported to the CDMA (Vogue) version of the Touch.

See also
HTC Touch 3G
TouchFLO
HTC Touch Family
O2 Xda Comet

References

External links

Featured in PC World's round-up of Top Canadian Smartphones and Cell Phones

Touch
Windows Mobile Professional devices
Mobile phones introduced in 2007
Mobile phones with user-replaceable battery